The Canton of La Côte Radieuse is a French former canton of Pyrénées-Orientales department, in Languedoc-Roussillon. It was created 25 January 1982 by the decree 82–84. It had 20,738 inhabitants (2012). It was disbanded following the French canton reorganisation which came into effect in March 2015.

Composition
The canton of La Côte Radieuse comprised 4 communes:
Saint-Cyprien 
Alénya
Latour-Bas-Elne
Saleilles

References

Cote Radieuse
2015 disestablishments in France
States and territories disestablished in 2015